was a Japanese singer and actress. She was born in Tokyo and studied music at University of Music and Performing Arts Vienna, lived and worked mainly in Europe and US, later she married German actor and singer Viktor de Kowa in 1939 and died in Munich.

Selected filmography
 Dschainah, das Mädchen aus dem Tanzhaus (1935)
 Last Love (1935)
 Yoshiwara (1937)
 Storm Over Asia (1938)
 Scandal at the Embassy (1950)
 Madame Butterfly (1954)
 Girl from Hong Kong (1961)

Bibliography

External links

1909 births
1988 deaths
Japanese film actresses
Singers from Tokyo
20th-century Japanese actresses
20th-century Japanese women singers
20th-century Japanese singers